The Sandy Hook Elementary School shooting occurred on December 14, 2012, in Newtown, Connecticut, United States, when 20-year-old Adam Lanza shot and killed 26 people. Twenty of the victims were children between six and seven years old, and the other six were adult staff members. Earlier that day, before driving to the school, Lanza had shot and killed his mother at their Newtown home. As first responders arrived at the school, Lanza died by suicide, shooting himself in the head.

The incident is, the deadliest mass shooting in Connecticut history, and the deadliest mass shooting at an elementary school in U.S. history. It is also the second deadliest school shooting in the U.S, and the fourth-deadliest mass shooting overall. The shooting prompted renewed debate about gun control in the United States, including proposals to make the background-check system universal, and for new federal and state gun legislation banning the sale and manufacture of certain types of semi-automatic firearms and magazines which can hold more than ten rounds of ammunition.

A November 2013 report issued by the Connecticut State Attorney's office concluded that Lanza acted alone and planned his actions, but provided no indication why he did so, or why he targeted the school. A report issued by the Office of the Child Advocate in November 2014 said that Lanza had Asperger syndrome and as a teenager had depression, anxiety, and obsessive-compulsive disorder, but concluded that they had "neither caused nor led to his murderous acts". The report went on to say, "his severe and deteriorating internalized mental health problems[...] combined with an atypical preoccupation with violence[...] (and) access to deadly weapons[...] proved a recipe for mass murder."

Background
As of November 30, 2012, 456 children were enrolled in kindergarten through fourth grade at Sandy Hook Elementary School. The school's security protocols had recently been upgraded, requiring visitors to be individually admitted after visual and identification review by video monitor. Doors to the school were locked at 9:30a.m. each day, after morning arrivals.

Violent crime had been rare in the town of 28,000 residents; there was only one homicide in the town in the ten years before the school shooting.

Under Connecticut law at the time, the 20-year-old Lanza was old enough to carry a long gun, such as a rifle or shotgun, but too young to own or carry handguns. The guns he used had been purchased legally by his mother.

Events

Murder of Nancy Lanza
Sometime before 9:30a.m. EST on December 14, 2012, Lanza shot and killed his mother Nancy Lanza, aged 52, with a .22-caliber Savage Mark II rifle at their Newtown home. Investigators later found her body clad in pajamas, in her bed, with four gunshot wounds to her head. Lanza then drove to Sandy Hook Elementary School in his mother's car.

Mass shooting begins
Shortly after 9:35a.m., armed with his mother's Bushmaster XM15-E2S rifle and ten magazines with 30 rounds each, Lanza shot his way through a glass panel next to the locked front entrance doors of the school. He was wearing black clothing, yellow earplugs, sunglasses, a black hat and an olive green utility vest. Initial reports that he was wearing body armor were incorrect. Some of those present heard the initial shots on the school intercom system, which was being used for morning announcements.

Principal Dawn Hochsprung and school psychologist Mary Sherlach were meeting with other faculty members when they heard, but did not recognize, gunshots. Hochsprung, Sherlach, and lead teacher Natalie Hammond went into the hall to determine the source of the sounds and encountered Lanza. A faculty member who was at the meeting said that the three women called out "Shooter! Stay put!" which alerted their colleagues to the danger and saved their lives. An aide heard gunshots. A teacher hiding in the math lab heard school janitor Rick Thorne yell, "Put the gun down!" Lanza killed both Hochsprung and Sherlach. Hammond was hit first in the leg, and then sustained another gunshot wound. She lay still in the hallway and then, not hearing any more noise, crawled back to the conference room and pressed her body against the door to keep it closed. She was later treated at Danbury Hospital.

A nine-year-old boy said he heard the shooter say "Put your hands up!" and someone else say "Don't shoot!" He also heard many people yelling and many gunshots over the intercom while he, his classmates, and his teacher took refuge in a closet in the gymnasium. Diane Day, a school therapist who had been at the faculty meeting with Hochsprung, heard screaming followed by more gunshots. A second teacher, who was a substitute kindergarten teacher, was wounded in the attack. While she was closing a door further down the hallway, she was hit in the foot with a bullet that ricocheted. Lanza never entered her classroom.

After killing Hochsprung and Sherlach, Lanza entered the main office but apparently did not see the people hiding there, and returned to the hallway. School nurse Sarah (Sally) Cox, 60, hid under a desk in her office. He remained standing for a few seconds before turning around and leaving. She and the school secretary Barbara Halstead called 9-1-1 and hid in a first-aid supply closet for as long as four hours. Janitor Rick Thorne ran through hallways, alerting classrooms.

Classroom shootings

Lanza entered Room 8, a first-grade classroom where Lauren Rousseau, a substitute teacher, had herded her first-grade students to the back of the room, and was trying to hide them in a bathroom, when Lanza forced his way into the classroom. Rousseau, Rachel D'Avino (a behavioral therapist who had been employed for a week at the school to work with a special needs student), and fifteen students in Rousseau's class were killed. Fourteen of the children were dead at the scene; one injured child was taken to a hospital for treatment, but was later declared dead. Most of the teachers and students were found crowded together in the bathroom. A six-year-old girl, the sole survivor, was found by police in the classroom following the shooting. She hid in a corner of the classroom's bathroom during the shooting. Her family's pastor said she survived by playing dead. When she reached her mother, she said, "Mommy, I'm okay, but all my friends are dead." The child described the shooter as "a very angry man". A girl hiding in a bathroom with two teachers told police that she heard a boy in the classroom screaming, "Help me! I don't want to be here!" to which Lanza responded, "Well, you're here," followed by "hammering" sounds.

Lanza also went to Room 10, another first-grade classroom nearby; at this point, there are conflicting reports about the order of events. According to some reports, the classroom's teacher, Victoria Leigh Soto, had concealed some of the students in a closet or bathroom, and some of the other students were hiding under desks. Soto was walking back to the classroom door to lock it when Lanza entered the classroom. Lanza walked to the back of the classroom, saw the children under the desks, and shot them. First-grader Jesse Lewis shouted at his classmates to run for safety, and several of them did. Lewis was looking at Lanza when Lanza fatally shot him. Another account, given by a surviving child's father, said that Soto had moved the children to the back of the classroom, and that they were seated on the floor when Lanza entered. According to this account, neither Lanza nor any of the occupants of the classroom spoke. Lanza stared at the people on the floor, pointed the gun at a boy seated there, but did not fire. The boy ran out of the classroom. The final report into the shooting concluded that the sequence of events in Rooms 8 and 10 was "indeterminate".

A Hartford Courant report said that six of the children who escaped did so when Lanza stopped shooting, either because his weapon jammed or he erred in reloading it. Earlier reports said that, as Lanza entered her classroom, Soto told him that the children were in the auditorium. When several of the children came out of their hiding places and tried to run for safety, Lanza fatally shot them. Soto put herself between her students and the shooter, who then fatally shot her. Anne Marie Murphy, the special education teacher who worked with special-needs students in Soto's classroom, was found covering six-year-old Dylan Hockley, who also died. Soto and four children were found dead in the classroom. Soto was near the north wall of the room with a set of keys nearby. One child was taken to the hospital, but was pronounced dead. Six surviving children from the class and a school bus driver took refuge at a nearby home. According to the official report released by the state's attorney, nine children ran from Soto's classroom, and police found two hiding in a class bathroom. Five of Soto's students were killed.

Survivors' eyewitness accounts
First-grade teacher Kaitlin Roig, 29 years old, hid fourteen students in a bathroom and barricaded the door, telling them to be completely quiet to remain safe. It is believed that Lanza bypassed her classroom, which was the first classroom on the left side of the hallway. Following a lockdown drill weeks earlier, Roig had failed to remove a piece of black construction paper covering the small window in her classroom door. Lanza may have assumed that Roig's classroom was empty because the door was closed and the window covered.

School library staff Yvonne Cech and Maryann Jacob tried to hide eighteen children in a part of the library the school used for lockdown in practice drills. When they discovered that one door would not lock, they had the children crawl into a storage room, where Cech barricaded the door with a filing cabinet.

Music teacher Maryrose Kristopik, 50, barricaded her fourth-graders in a tiny supply closet during the rampage. Lanza arrived moments later, pounding on the door and yelling, "Let me in," while the students in Kristopik's class quietly hid inside.

Two third-grade students, chosen as classroom helpers, were walking down the hallway to the office to deliver the morning attendance sheet as the shooting began. Teacher Abbey Clements pulled both children into her classroom, where they hid.

Laura Feinstein, a reading specialist at the school, gathered two students from outside her classroom and hid with them under desks after they heard gunshots. Feinstein called the school office and tried to call 911, but could not connect due to lack of reception on her cell phone. She hid with the children for approximately 40 minutes, at which point law enforcement came to lead them out of the room.

Shooter's suicide
The police heard the final shot at 9:40:03a.m. They believed that it was Lanza shooting himself in the lower rear portion of his head with the Glock 20SF in classroom 10. Lanza's body was found wearing a pale green pocket vest over a black polo shirt, over a black T-shirt, black sneakers, black fingerless gloves, black socks, and a black canvas belt. Other objects found in the vicinity of Lanza included a black boonie hat and thin frame glasses. The Glock was found, apparently jammed, near Lanza, and the rifle was found several feet away from him. A 9mm SIG Sauer P226, which had not been fired during the incident, was found on Lanza's person.

Immediate aftermath
Authorities determined that Lanza reloaded frequently during the shootings, sometimes firing only 15 rounds from a 30-round magazine. He shot all but two of his victims multiple times. Most of the shooting took place in two first-grade classrooms near the entrance of the school. The students among the victims totaled eight boys and twelve girls, all either six or seven years old, and the six adults were all women who worked at the school. Bullets were also found in at least three cars parked outside the school, leading police to believe that he fired at a teacher who was standing near a window. When police interviewed survivors, a teacher recalled hearing Lanza curse several times, as well as say such things as, "Look at me!" and "Come over here!" and "Look at them!"

Police response

The first call to 911 was around 9:35a.m. Newtown 911 police dispatch first broadcast that there was a shooting at Sandy Hook Elementary School (SHES) at 9:36a.m., about 30 seconds after they received the first call. Connecticut State Police (CSP) were dispatched at 9:37a.m. Newtown police arrived at the school street at 9:39a.m., approximately three-and-a-half minutes after the 911 call, and Connecticut State Police arrived at the school street at 9:46a.m. Newtown police first entered the school at 9:45a.m., approximately nine minutes after the first 911 call and approximately ten minutes after the shooting started. This was approximately five minutes after the last shot was heard. No shots were fired by the police.

The Newtown police and Connecticut State Police mobilized local police dog and police tactical units, a bomb squad, and a state police helicopter. Police locked down the school and began evacuating the survivors room by room, escorting groups of students and adults away from the school. They swept the school for other shooters at least four times.

At approximately 10:00a.m., Danbury Hospital sent extra medical personnel in expectation of having to treat numerous victims. Three wounded patients were evacuated to the hospital, where two children were later declared dead. The other was an unidentified adult.

The New York City medical examiner dispatched a portable morgue to assist the authorities. The victims' bodies were removed from the school and formally identified during the night after the shooting. A state trooper was assigned to each victim's family to protect their privacy and provide them with information.

On December 4, 2013, seven 911 calls relating to the shooting were made public.

Investigation

On-site

Investigators did not find a suicide note or any messages referring to the planning of the attack. Janet Robinson, superintendent of Newtown schools, said she had not found any connection between Lanza's mother and the school, in contrast to initial media reports that said Lanza's mother had worked there. Police also investigated whether Lanza was the person who had been in an altercation with four staff members at Sandy Hook School the day before the massacre. It was presumed that he killed two of the four staff members involved in the altercation (the principal and the psychologist) and wounded the third (the lead teacher) in the attack; the fourth staff member was not at the school that day. The state police said they did not know of any reports about any altercations at the school.

Police sources initially reported that Lanza's brother Ryan Lanza, then aged 24, was the perpetrator. This was probably because Adam was carrying Ryan's identification, Ryan told The Jersey Journal. Ryan, who lived in Hoboken, New Jersey, and was at his job in New York City at the time of the shooting, voluntarily submitted to questioning by New Jersey State Police, Connecticut State Police, and the Federal Bureau of Investigation. Police said he was not considered a suspect, and he was not taken into custody. Ryan said he had not been in touch with Adam since 2010; when asked why, Ryan said his brother was "sick", "[doesn't] talk to anyone", and that Ryan "didn't know him anymore". Connecticut State Police indicated their concern about misinformation being posted on social media sites and threatened prosecution of anyone involved with such activities. Ryan was also mistakenly reported to have mourned his mother and brother on social media and to have been interviewed by the New York Post. A spokesperson for the Lanza family later said an impostor gave the interview.

A large quantity of unused ammunition was recovered inside the school along with three semi-automatic firearms found with Lanza: a .223-caliber Bushmaster XM15-E2S rifle, a 10mm Glock 20SF handgun, and a 9mm SIG Sauer P226 handgun. Outside the school, an Izhmash Saiga-12 shotgun was found in the car Lanza had driven to the school, a black Honda Civic.

On March 28, 2013, court documents released from the investigation showed that the shooting had occurred in the space of fewer than five minutes with 156 shots fired. This comprised 154 shots from the rifle and two shots from the 10mm pistol. Lanza fired one shot from the Glock in the hallway and killed himself with another shot from the pistol to the head.

Off-site
Shortly after the shooting, police announced that Lanza used the rifle to kill the victims at the school. At a press conference on December 15, Dr. H. Wayne Carver II, the Chief Medical Examiner of Connecticut, was asked about the wounds, and replied "All the ones that I know of at this point were caused by the long weapon." When asked if the children suffered before dying, Carver replied by stating that "If so, not for very long". Carver, whose office autopsied the victims and who personally performed seven, said the injuries were "devastating" and that parents identified their children from photographs to spare them the sight. All the child victims were first-graders, and all were killed with the Bushmaster XM15. Carver said the bullets used were "designed in such a fashion the energy is deposited in the tissue so the bullet stays in."

Investigators evaluated Lanza's body, looking for evidence of drugs or medication through toxicology tests.  Unusually for an investigation of this type, DNA testing of Lanza was utilized. The results of the toxicology report were published in October 2013, and stated that no alcohol or drugs were found in his system. Lanza's autopsy showed no tumors or gross deformities in his brain.

Lanza removed the hard drive from his computer and damaged it prior to the shooting, creating a challenge for investigators to recover data. At the time of publication of the final report, it had not been possible to recover data from it. Police believe that Lanza extensively researched earlier mass shootings, they found that Lanza had downloaded videos relating to the Columbine High School massacre, other shootings and two videos of suicide by gunshot.

Details of the investigation were reported by law enforcement officials at a meeting of the International Association of Police Chiefs and Colonels held during the week of March 11, 2013. An article published in the New York Daily News on March 17, 2013, provided purported details of this report by an anonymous law enforcement veteran who had attended the meeting. The source stated that the investigation had found that Lanza had created a 7-by-4-foot sized spreadsheet listing around 500 mass murderers and the weapons they used, which was considered to have taken years of work and to have been used by Lanza as a "score sheet". On March 18, 2013, Lt. Paul Vance of the Connecticut State Police responded that the information from this meeting was "law enforcement sensitive information" and considered the release to be a leak.

The March 28 documents also provided details on items found at Lanza's home, including three samurai swords, a newspaper article about the Northern Illinois University shooting, and a National Rifle Association certificate. The NRA denied that Adam Lanza or Nancy Lanza were members and reporters noted that the NRA site provides training certificate completion templates for courses offered by NRA Certified Instructors. A gun safe was found in a bedroom and investigators found more than 1,400 rounds of ammunition and other firearms. At home, Lanza had access to three more firearms: a .45 Henry rifle, a .30 Enfield rifle, and a .22 Marlin rifle. These were legally owned by Lanza's mother, who was described as a gun enthusiast. According to Time, authorities also found a photograph of Lanza holding a gun to his head at his home following his death.

According to The New York Times, law enforcement officials commented that Lanza would spend most of his time in his basement doing solitary activities. According to the same officials, it also appeared that Lanza "may have taken target practice in the basement".

Final reports

State Attorney's report 
The final report of the State Attorney summarizing the investigation into the shooting was published on November 25, 2013. It concluded that Adam Lanza had acted alone, and that the case was closed. The report noted that "[Lanza] had a familiarity with and access to firearms and ammunition and an obsession with mass murders, in particular the April 1999 shootings at Columbine High School in Colorado." The report did not identify a specific motive for the shooting, stating, "The evidence clearly shows that the shooter planned his actions, including the taking of his own life, but there is no clear indication why he did so, or why he targeted Sandy Hook elementary school."

On the question of Lanza's state of mind, the report noted "significant mental health issues that affected his ability to live a normal life and to interact with others, even those to whom he should have been close ... What contribution this made to the shootings, if any, is unknown as those mental health professionals who saw him did not see anything that would have predicted his future behavior." The report found no evidence that Lanza had taken drugs or medication that would have affected his behavior, and observed, "'Why did the shooter murder twenty-seven people, including twenty children?' Unfortunately, that question may never be answered conclusively, despite the collection of extensive background information on the shooter through a multitude of interviews and other sources."

On December 27, 2013, police released thousands of pages of documents pertaining to the investigation. In accordance with law, the names of victims and witnesses were redacted or withheld. The summary report included information about items found on Lanza's computer equipment, including writings and material about previous mass shootings. A former teacher of Lanza's noted that he exhibited antisocial behavior, rarely interacted with other students, and was obsessed with writing "about battles, destruction and war."

Report of the Office of the Child Advocate
The Report of the Office of the Child Advocate concluded:  "There was not one thing that was necessarily the tipping point driving Lanza to commit the Sandy Hook shooting. Rather there was a cascade of events, many self-imposed, that included: loss of school; absence of work; disruption of the relationship with his one friend; virtually no personal contact with family; virtually total and increasing isolation; fear of losing his home and of a change in his relationship with Mrs. Lanza, his only caretaker and connection; worsening OCD; depression and anxiety; profound and possibly worsening anorexia; and an increasing obsession with mass murder occurring in the total absence of any engagement with the outside world. Adam increasingly lived in an alternate universe in which ruminations about mass shootings were his central
preoccupation".

The authors also noted that despite multiple developmental and mental health problems, Lanza had not received adequate mental health treatment. They wrote: "It is fair to surmise that, had Lanza's mental illness been adequately treated in the last years of his life, one predisposing factor to the tragedy of Sandy Hook might have been mitigated".

The report also tentatively disagreed with the conclusions of the State Attorney about why Lanza targeted Sandy Hook. They noted that "According to the FBI, shooters are likely to target places or people that are familiar to them ... The elementary school may have been targeted because he could overpower people, a dynamic that is very important for mass shooters as they do not want to be thwarted".

Perpetrator
Adam Peter Lanza (April 22, 1992 – December 14, 2012) lived with his mother, Nancy Lanza, in Newtown,  from the elementary school. He did not have a criminal record. He had access to guns through his mother, who was described as a "gun enthusiast who owned at least a dozen firearms". She often took her two sons to a local shooting range, where they learned to shoot. Lanza's father has said that he does not believe Nancy feared Adam. She did not confide any fear of Adam to her sister or to her best friend, slept with her bedroom door unlocked, and kept guns in the house.

Education
Lanza attended Sandy Hook Elementary School for four and a half years. He began at Newtown Middle School in 2004, but according to his mother was "wracked by anxiety". She told friends that her son started getting upset in middle school because of frequent classroom changes during the day. The movement and noise were too stimulating and made him anxious. At one point his anxiety was so intense that she took him to the emergency room at Danbury Hospital. Because of the smaller class sizes, his mother moved him to a parochial school, St. Rose of Lima. According to a classmate at St. Rose of Lima, he entered "late in the school year", and he left in June 2005.

At age 14, he went to Newtown High School, where he was named to the honor roll in 2007. Students and teachers who knew him in high school described Lanza as "intelligent but nervous and fidgety". He avoided attracting attention and was uncomfortable socializing. He is not known to have had any close friends in school. Schoolwork often triggered his underlying sense of hopelessness and by 2008, when he turned 16, he was only going to school occasionally. The intense anxiety Lanza experienced at the time suggests his autism might have been exacerbated by the hormonal shifts of adolescence. He was taken out of high school and home-schooled by his mother and father. He earned a GED. In 2008 and 2009, he also attended some classes at Western Connecticut State University.

Early living and his developmental and mental health problems
While living in New Hampshire at the time, Lanza exhibited developmental challenges before the age of three. These included communication and sensory difficulties, socialization delays, and repetitive behaviors. He was seen by the New Hampshire Birth to Three intervention program and referred to special education preschool services. Once at elementary school, he was diagnosed with a sensory-integration disorder. The sensory-processing disorder does not have official status by the medical community as a formal diagnosis but is a common characteristic of autism. His anxiety affected his ability to attend school and in 8th grade he was placed on "homebound" status, which is reserved for children who are too disabled, even with supports and accommodations, to attend school.

When he was 13, Lanza was diagnosed with Asperger syndrome by a psychiatrist, Paul Fox. When he was 14, his parents took him to Yale University's Child Study Center, where he was also diagnosed with obsessive-compulsive disorder (OCD). He frequently washed his hands and changed his socks 20 times a day, to the point where his mother did three loads of laundry a day. He also sometimes went through a box of tissues in a day because he could not touch a doorknob with his bare hand.

Lanza was treated by Robert King, who recommended extensive support be put in place, and King's colleague Kathleen Koenig at the Yale Child Study Center prescribed the antidepressant Celexa. Lanza took the medication for three days. His mother Nancy reported: "On the third morning he complained of dizziness. By that afternoon he was disoriented, his speech was disjointed, he couldn't even figure out how to open his cereal box. He was sweating profusely ... it was actually dripping off his hands. He said he couldn't think ... He was practically vegetative." He never took the medication again. A report from the Office of the Child Advocate found that "Yale's recommendations for extensive special education supports, ongoing expert consultation, and rigorous therapeutic supports embedded into (Lanza's) daily life went largely unheeded."

In a 2013 interview, Peter Lanza said he suspected his son might have also had undiagnosed schizophrenia in addition to his other conditions. Lanza said that family members might have missed signs of the onset of schizophrenia and psychotic behavior during his son's adolescence because they mistakenly attributed his odd behavior and increasing isolation to Asperger syndrome. Because of concerns that published accounts of Lanza's autism could result in a backlash against others with the condition, autism advocates campaigned to clarify that autism is a brain-related developmental disorder rather than a mental illness. The violence Lanza demonstrated in the shooting is generally not seen in the autistic population and none of the psychiatrists he saw detected troubling signs of violence in his disposition.

Lanza appears to have had no contact with mental health providers after 2006. The report from the Office of the Child Advocate stated: "In the course of Lanza's entire life, minimal mental health evaluation and treatment (in relation to his apparent need) was obtained. Of the couple of providers that saw him, only one—the Yale Child Study Center—seemed to appreciate the gravity of (his) presentation, his need for extensive mental health and special education supports, and the critical need for medication to ease his obsessive-compulsive symptoms."

Investigators found Lanza was fascinated with mass shootings, such as the Columbine High School massacre. Among the clippings found in his room, there was a story from The New York Times about a man who shot at schoolchildren in 1891. His computer contained two videos of gunshot suicides, movies that showed school shootings, and two pictures of Lanza pointing guns at his own head.

This only came to light after Lanza died, because he never permitted others to access his bedroom, including his mother. Lanza had also taped black plastic garbage bags over the windows in his bedroom to block out sunlight. He had cut off contact with both his father and brother in the two years before the shooting and at one point communicated with his mother, who lived in the same house, only by email. A document titled "Selfish", describing Lanza's belief in the inherent selfishness of women, was found on his computer after his death.

Final months
According to a report by the Office of the Child Advocate in Connecticut in November 2014, Lanza may have had anorexia nervosa. The authors wrote that "Anorexia can produce cognitive impairment and it is likely that anorexia combined with an autism spectrum disorder and OCD compounded Lanza's risk for suicide". They also noted that at the time of his death, Lanza "was anorexic (he was six feet tall (183 cm) and weighed 112 pounds (51 kg)), to the point of malnutrition and resultant brain damage."

He was also living in almost total isolation in his room, spending most of his time on the internet playing World of Warcraft and other video games. The report stated that he "descended" into a world where his only communication with the outside world was with members of a cyber-community, "a small community of individuals that shared his dark and obsessive interest in mass murder".

In the weeks before the killings, Lanza's mother was considering moving him to another town. She planned to purchase a recreational vehicle for him to stay in so that potential purchasers could see the house without disturbing him. The Report of the Child Advocate stated that:

James Knoll, a forensic psychiatrist at SUNY Upstate Medical University, was consulted about what motivated Lanza to kill. Knoll states that Lanza's final act conveyed a distinct message: "I carry profound hurt—I'll go ballistic and transfer it onto you."

Legal proceedings 
In January 2015, the families of two of the first-graders who died in the shooting filed a lawsuit against the city of Newtown and the Newtown Board of Education alleging inadequate security at the school. In March, it was announced that parents of children and teachers killed in the shooting had filed lawsuits against the estate of Nancy Lanza. The suits are based on a claim that she did not properly secure her firearms, which allowed her son, a person with mental health issues, to gain access to them. The attorneys representing the families said Lanza was believed to have had homeowner's insurance on her home worth more than $1 million and they were seeking compensation based on that.

On October 16, 2019, a jury awarded Leonard Pozner $450,000 for defamation by James Fetzer, who had co-written the book Nobody Died at Sandy Hook. The book claimed that Pozner had fabricated the death certificate of his son Noah, a six-year-old victim of the shooting. Fetzer said he would appeal the decision.

Remington 
On December 15, 2014, nine families of the 26 victims of the shooting filed a class-action lawsuit in Connecticut against Bushmaster, Remington Arms, Camfour, a distributor of firearms, and the now-closed East Windsor store, Riverview Sales, where the gunman's rifle was purchased, seeking "unspecified" damages, claiming an exemption from the 2005 Federal Protection of Lawful Commerce in Arms Act (PLCAA) that would normally disallow such a suit as lacking standing. The plaintiffs allege that the XM15-E2S is suitable only for military and policing applications and that Bushmaster inappropriately marketed it to civilians. In January 2015, Bushmaster's attorneys petitioned to have the suit moved to federal court because, although the shooting took place in Connecticut, it is located in North Carolina. In February 2015, the victims' families' attorneys made a motion to move the suit back to state court. On April 14, 2016, a Connecticut court denied the defendants' motion to summarily dismiss the case. Lawyers for the defense filed a second motion for dismissal a month later. On October 14, 2016, the defendants' motion to dismiss the lawsuit was granted. The judge ruled the complaint was not valid per federal and Connecticut laws.

The families appealed to the Connecticut Supreme Court. In March 2019, the court decided in a 4–3 vote to reverse parts of the trial court's rulings and remand the case back to Bridgeport Superior Court for additional hearings. It ruled that the families' appeal to the Connecticut Unfair Trade Practices Act, demonstrating that the gun manufacturers had used advertising that presented the weapons in an "unfair, unethical, or dangerous manner", with Remington seeking to "expand the market for [its] assault weapons through advertising campaigns that encouraged consumers ... to launch offensive assaults against their perceived enemies", was not prohibited by PLCAA, and thus that the plaintiffs had sufficient standing to argue their case at trial court. It also ruled that the plaintiffs can subpoena internal documents on how gun companies have marketed the AR-15. Remington asked the Supreme Court of the United States to review the state court ruling, but in November 2019 the Supreme Court declined to hear the appeal, allowing the families' suit to proceed.

On July 26, 2021, a judge refused to dismiss the lawsuit. In court documents the next day, Remington offered $33 million to be shared by the nine families. On February 15, 2022, Remington agreed to settle for $73 million, according to the families' attorney, Josh Koskoff.

Alex Jones 

On April 17, 2018, radio host and conspiracy theorist Alex Jones was sued for defamation by three parents whose children were killed in the shooting. Prior to this, Jones said that the Sandy Hook shooting was "completely fake" and a "giant hoax" perpetrated by opponents of the Second Amendment. Jones claims he later believed the shooting was real. On May 23, 2018, six more families sued Jones for his claims. Jones was found to be in contempt of court by a Texas judge even before the trial started, failing to produce witnesses and materials relevant to the procedures. Consequently, Jones and InfoWars were fined a total of $126,000 in October and December 2019.

In October 2021, Jones was ordered to pay damages and was criticized by a judge for failing to hand over documents requested by the courts. Jones declared bankruptcy in April 2022 as a result of the defamation lawsuits caused by his claims that the shooting was a hoax.

On August 4, 2022, Jones was ordered to pay $4.1M compensatory damages to Sandy Hook parents and, on August 5, 2022, he was ordered to pay a further $45.2M in punitive damages.

On October 12, 2022, Jones was ordered to pay $965 million in damages to the families of Sandy Hook victims.

Aftermath 
The school was closed indefinitely following the shooting, partially because it remained a crime scene. Sandy Hook students returned to classes on January 3, 2013, at Chalk Hill Middle School in nearby Monroe at the town's invitation. Chalk Hill at the time was an unused facility, refurbished after the shooting, with desks and equipment brought in from Sandy Hook Elementary. The Chalk Hill school was temporarily renamed "Sandy Hook". The University of Connecticut created a scholarship for the surviving children of the shootings.

On January 31, the Newtown school board voted unanimously to ask for police officer presence in all of its elementary schools; previously other schools in the district had such protection, but Sandy Hook had not been one of those.

On May 10, a task force of 28 appointed members voted to demolish the existing Sandy Hook Elementary school and have a new school built in its place. The $57 million proposed project was sent to the Newtown Board of Education for approval, to be followed by a public ballot. In October 2013, Newtown residents voted 4,504–558 in favor of the proposed demolition and reconstruction, to be funded by $50 million in state money. Demolition began on October 25 and was completed in December 2013 at a cost of nearly US$1.4 million.

After the town clerk's office was inundated with requests from the media, Connecticut House of Representatives Republican Dan Carter introduced legislation that would restrict access to public information available under the Freedom of Information Act. On June 5, both houses (Senate and House of Representatives) of the Connecticut state legislature passed a bill modifying the state's Freedom of Information Act in order to "prevent the release of crime-scene photos and video evidence from the Sandy Hook Elementary School massacre and other Connecticut homicides, concerned such records would be spread on the Internet." The bill then went on to Gov. Dannel P. Malloy's desk for his signature. The bill creates a new exemption to the state's Freedom of Information Act. The release of photographs, film, video, digital or other visual images depicting a homicide victim is prevented if such records "could reasonably be expected to constitute an unwarranted invasion of the personal privacy of the victim or the victim's surviving family members."

The Sandy Hook Promise Foundation, a 501(c)(3) nonprofit, was formed to help survivors and families of the victims while also continuing the service of assisting others impacted by other shootings across the United States.

Responses

President Barack Obama gave a televised address on the day of the shootings: "We're going to have to come together and take meaningful action to prevent more tragedies like this, regardless of the politics." Obama expressed "enormous sympathy for families that are affected". He also ordered flags to be flown at half-staff at the White House and other U.S. federal government facilities worldwide in respect of the victims. On December 16, Obama traveled to Newtown where he met with victims' families and spoke at an interfaith vigil.

Dannel Malloy, the Governor of Connecticut, addressed the media the evening of the shootings near a local church holding a vigil for the victims, urging the people of Connecticut to come together and help each other. Malloy said, "Evil visited this community today, and it is too early to speak of recovery, but each parent, each sibling, each member of the family has to understand that Connecticut, we are all in this together, we will do whatever we can to overcome this event, we will get through it." Hundreds of mourners, including Malloy, attended vigils in various churches in Newtown. On December 17, Malloy called for a statewide moment of silence and church bells to be tolled 26 times at 9:30 a.m. on December 21, exactly one week after the school shooting.

U.S. Secretary of Education Arne Duncan said: "our thanks go out to every teacher, staff member, and first responder who cared for, comforted, and protected children from harm, often at risk to themselves. We will do everything in our power to assist and support the healing and recovery of Newtown."

The day after the shootings, Lanza's father released a statement:

Leaders from other countries and organizations throughout the world also offered their condolences through the weekend after the shooting.

President Obama posthumously honored the six adults with the 2012 Presidential Citizens Medal on February 15, 2013.  President Obama said "And then when Dawn Hochsprung, and Mary Sherlach, Vicki Soto, Lauren Rousseau, Rachel D'Avino, Anne Marie Murphy—when they showed up for work at Sandy Hook Elementary on December 14th of last year, they expected a day like any other—doing what was right for their kids; spent a chilly morning readying classrooms and welcoming young students—they had no idea that evil was about to strike.  And when it did, they could have taken shelter by themselves.  They could have focused on their own safety, on their own wellbeing.  But they didn't.  They gave their lives to protect the precious children in their care.  They gave all they had for the most innocent and helpless among us. And that's what we honor today—the courageous heart, the selfless spirit, the inspiring actions of extraordinary Americans, extraordinary citizens."

Sandy Hook conspiracy theories have become social phenomena, despite overwhelming contemporary coverage of the incident.

Gun control

The Sandy Hook Elementary School shooting prompted renewed debate about gun control in the United States, including proposals for making the background-check system universal, and for new federal and state legislation banning the sale and manufacture of certain types of semi-automatic firearms and magazines with more than ten rounds of ammunition.

Within hours of the shooting, a We the People petition was started asking the White House to "immediately address the issue of gun control through the introduction of legislation in Congress", and the gun control advocacy group the Brady Campaign to Prevent Gun Violence reported that an avalanche of donations in the hours after the shooting caused its website to crash. Five days later, President Obama announced that he would make gun control a "central issue" of his second term, and he created a gun violence task force, to be headed by Vice President Joe Biden. On January 16, 2013, Obama signed 23 executive orders and proposed 12 congressional actions regarding gun control. His proposals included universal background checks on firearms purchases, an assault weapons ban, and a high-capacity magazine ban limiting capacity to 10 cartridges.

On December 21, 2012, the National Rifle Association's Wayne LaPierre said gun-free school zones attract killers and that another gun ban would not protect Americans. He called on Congress to appropriate funds to hire armed police officers for every American school and announced that the NRA would create the National School Shield Emergency Response Program to help. After LaPierre's press conference, the Brady Campaign asked for donations to support its gun control advocacy and asked NRA members "who believe like we do, that we are better than this" to join its campaign. On January 8, 2013, former Congresswoman Gabby Giffords, who was shot and injured in a 2011 shooting in Tucson, launched the gun control group Americans for Responsible Solutions, with a specific aim of matching or exceeding the fundraising capabilities of the NRA and similar groups.

On January 16, 2013, New York became the first U.S. state to act after the shooting when it enacted the Secure Ammunition and Firearms Enforcement (SAFE) Act. On April 3, 2013, the Connecticut General Assembly passed a 139-page major gun-control bill with broad bipartisan support. Governor Malloy signed the bill on the same day. The bill requires universal background checks (background checks for all firearm purchases) and a high-capacity magazine ban banning the sale or purchase of ammunition magazines capable of holding more than ten rounds of ammunition like those used in the Sandy Hook Elementary School shooting. It also created the first registry in the United States for dangerous-weapon offenders, and added over 100 types of guns to the state's assault weapons ban. Pro-gun groups had rallied outside the Capitol to protest prior to the signing and challenged it in court. Federal judge Alfred Covello ruled to uphold the law in January 2014.

On April 4, 2013, Maryland also enacted new restrictions to their existing gun laws. However, ten other states passed laws that relaxed gun restrictions.

Legislation introduced in the first session of 113th Congress included the Assault Weapons Ban of 2013 and the Manchin-Toomey Amendment to expand background checks on gun purchases. Both were defeated in the Senate on April 17, 2013.

Video games
A renewed debate about the effects of violent video games on young people began soon after the shooting due to news reports suggesting Lanza frequently played violent video games. Wayne LaPierre publicly blamed video games for the shooting, specifically targeting the free online game Kindergarten Killers created by Gary Short.

Police found numerous video games in the basement of Adam Lanza's home, which was used as a gaming area. The final report into the shooting by the State Attorney, published in November 2013, noted that "[Lanza] played video games often, both solo at home and online. They could be described as both violent and non-violent. One person described the shooter as spending the majority of his time playing non-violent video games all day, with his favorite at one point being Super Mario Bros."

The report described his liking for Dance Dance Revolution, which he played frequently for hours with an acquaintance at a movie theater in Danbury which had a commercial version of the game, and also played the game at home. Dance Dance Revolution is a non-violent exercising game where "the user is required to move their feet rhythmically in response to video cues". According to the Report by the Office of the Child Advocate, Lanza would play the game for hours on end using it as a distraction from his inner turmoil. The report said "he would whip himself into a frenzy, a behavior consistent, possibly, with a need to contain anxiety-producing impulses and thoughts. There were days when he would not do anything else but Dance Dance Revolution.

The final report by the State Attorney did not make a link between video games and the motive for the shooting. However, the Report of the Child Advocate said "video game and internet addiction appear to be 'highly comorbid with several other psychiatric disorders' including anxiety, depression, and obsessive compulsive challenges".

Legacy 
Many organizations were created due to the massacre that work to promote an end to school shootings, with some, such as Jesse Lewis Choose Love Movement, Sandy Hook Promise, and Safe and Sound Schools organized and led by parents of victims, while others, such as Moms Demand Action, were created by outsiders outraged by the shooting.

Effect on the community

2014
In March 2014, the Newtown city officials announced the design for the new Sandy Hook Elementary School. The only remnant of the original school would be its flagpole.

A few days later, the Newtown-Sandy Hook Community Foundation released results of a survey with over 1,600 respondents. Among other inquiries, the survey asked residents what should be done with the balance of the $11 million US Dollars in donations that had been received since the incident in 2012. The majority of responses said that money for mental health counseling and other family expenses should be the top priorities. A few responses suggested that some of the money should be used to purchase and tear down the shooter's family home in order to replace it with a park or wildlife sanctuary. Jennifer Barahona, the foundation's executive director, was quoted as saying, "That's not something we're considering at this time. It's really outside of our scope."

On October 21, building site preparation work began on the new Sandy Hook Elementary School; project updates and progress were posted on a dedicated website. Citing security and privacy reasons and out of respect for the families of victims, no ground breaking ceremony was held. Construction was scheduled to begin in March 2015 with the school expected to open by December 2016.

In December, it was announced that the town of Newtown will acquire the property and home of Nancy Lanza at no cost. The property at 36 Yogananda St. was part of the Lanza estate, to which surviving son Ryan Lanza is the sole heir. Lanza's attorney, Kenneth Gruder, arranged for the transfer through a series of transactions so that probate records would not show the city acquiring the property from the Lanza family. Gruder said the notoriety of the home had made it essentially unsalable. The home was demolished in March 2015.

2015
On January 21, 2015, Newtown Legislative Council voted unanimously to demolish the house where Nancy and Adam Lanza lived, and to keep the land as open space. The demolition was completed on March 24, 2015.

In February 2015, the family of one of the victims, Victoria Soto, applied for trademark protection for her name. The reason for this was to help prevent others from misusing Soto's name on social media and for the benefit of the memorial fund set up in her name. The victim's sister, Jillian, said fake social media accounts existed using her sister's name to promote conspiracy theories about the shooting.

2016–present
In July 2016, the new Sandy Hook Elementary School was unveiled and parents were shown around the building. The new school is on the site of the building where the shooting took place, which was demolished and rebuilt with a state grant of around $50 million.

Memorial 

In 2013, the Newtown board of selectmen appointed the Sandy Hook Permanent Memorial Commission. Out of 189 design submissions, the commission chose a design created by Dan Affleck and Ben Waldo of SWA Group. $3.7 million to construct the memorial was narrowly approved by Newtown voters in April 2021, and site work began in August 2021. Construction was completed in August 2022. The memorial opened to the public on November 13, 2022, after a private ceremony with the victims' families. It features a stone basin engraved with the names of the victims, with a young sycamore tree at its center. A memorial mass is held every year at St. Rose of Lima Church.

See also
 List of attacks related to primary schools
 List of school-related attacks
 List of school shootings in the United States (2000–present)
 
 Robb Elementary School shooting, another elementary school shooting in Uvalde, Texas

Notes

References

External links

 
 Sandy Hook Elementary School Official website (Archive)
 Final Report
 28 Dead, Including 20 Children, After Shooting Rampage At Sandy Hook School In Newtown (via Wayback Machine)

 
2012 active shooter incidents in the United States
2012 in Connecticut
2012 mass shootings in the United States
2012 murders in the United States
21st-century mass murder in the United States
Articles containing video clips
Attacks on buildings and structures in 2012
Crimes in Connecticut
Deaths by firearm in Connecticut
December 2012 crimes in the United States
December 2012 events in the United States
Elementary school killings in the United States
Elementary school shootings in the United States
Gun politics in the United States
Massacres in 2012
Mass shootings in Connecticut
Mass shootings in the United States
Massacres in the United States
Matricides
Murder in Connecticut
Murder–suicides in Connecticut
Newtown, Connecticut
School massacres in the United States
School shootings in the United States
Spree shootings in the United States